Markovce is a village and municipality in Michalovce District in the Kosice Region of eastern Slovakia.

History
In historical records the village was first mentioned in 1281.

Geography
The village lies at an altitude of 114 metres and covers an area of  (2020-06-30/-07-01).

References

External links
https://web.archive.org/web/20090621123522/http://www.statistics.sk/mosmis/eng/run.html

Villages and municipalities in Michalovce District